Ishq Tu Hi Tu is a 2015 Indian Odia-language drama film written by Tapas Sargharia and produced by Tarang Cine Productions.  It stars Arindam Roy and Elina Samantray in lead roles while Aparajita Mohanty and Mihir Das play supporting roles.

Plot
The movie is based on inter-community love. The storyline is based on 1991 communal riots in Dhamnagar area of Bhadrak district.

Cast

 Arindam Roy as Raghu
 Elina Samantray as Zoya Muslim Girl
 Aparajita Mohanty
 Mihir Das
 Minaketan Das
 Samaresh Routray

References 

2015 films
2010s Odia-language films
2015 romantic drama films
Indian romantic drama films
Films directed by Tapas Sargharia